Goodenow may refer to:

Places
Goodenow, Illinois
Goodenow Grove Nature Preserve, nature preserve in Illinois.

People with the surname
Bob Goodenow, American business manager
Robert Goodenow,(1800–1874) American politician
Rufus K. Goodenow, (1790–1863) American politician
John M. Goodenow, (1782–1838) American politician

See also
Justice Goodenow (disambiguation)